Sarun may refer to:

Sarun, Iran (disambiguation), villages in Iran
Chan Sarun (born 1951), Cambodian politician
Sarun Promkaew (born 1982), Thai footballer
Sarun Van (born 1949), Cambodian swimmer

See also